The Simple Mail Access Protocol (SMAP) is an application layer Internet protocol for accessing e-mail stored on a server.  It was introduced as part of the Courier suite, with the goal of creating a simpler and more capable alternative to IMAP.

, SMAP is still considered experimental, and is only supported by the Courier server and Cone client.

Features
 MIME attachments can be transmitted in their raw, decoded form.  This allows large base64-encoded attachments to be transmitted without the 4:3 inflation that base64 encoding usually incurs.
 Support for sending outgoing e-mails through the SMAP connection, instead of using a separate SMTP connection to the server.  An outgoing message only needs to be transmitted once to both send it and save a copy to a server-side folder.
 Unicode folder names, with native support for hierarchy.
 SMAP clients and servers can fall back to IMAP if the peer does not support SMAP.

See also
 POP4, another attempt at creating a "simpler IMAP", by extending POP3

References

External links
 Simple Mail Access Protocol, Version 1

Internet mail protocols